Mihhail Korb (born on 3 August 1980 Pärnu) is Estonian politician. He is member of XIV Riigikogu. Since 2002 he belongs to Estonian Centre Party.

2016-2017 he was Minister of Public Administration.

He has been member of XII and XIII Riigikogu.

Career

2016-2017 - Minister of Public Administration
06.2014–... Riigikogu MP
10.2011–06.2014 Tallinn Old City (Tallinn's Borough) District Elder/Chief Executive 
12.2009–10.2011 Kristiine (Tallinn's Borough) District Elder/Chief Executive
12.2005–10.2009 Kristiine (Tallinn's Borough) District Elder/Chief Executive
03.2004–11.2005 Mustamäe (Tallinn's Borough) FP&A Specialist

References

1980 births
21st-century Estonian politicians
Estonian Centre Party politicians
Living people
Members of the Riigikogu, 2011–2015
Members of the Riigikogu, 2015–2019
Members of the Riigikogu, 2019–2023
People from Pärnu
Tallinn University of Technology alumni